Amorupi hudepohli is a species of longhorn beetle in the Elaphidiini subfamily. It was described by Martins in 1974.

References

Elaphidiini
Beetles described in 1974